is a Japanese singer, actor, and voice actor. He is a member of the boy band Run&Gun. He was part of the casts of Musical Air Gear with his fellow band members, a voice actor for Lovely Complex, and he also portrays Seigi Ozaki in the tokusatsu franchise Kamen Rider Den-O.

Discography

Filmography

Movie
 Route 58 (2003)

Anime
 Lovely Complex (2007) – Atsushi Ōtani
 Hatara Kids: My Ham Gumi – Steve

TV Drama
 Kamen Rider Den-O (2007) – Seigi Ozaki
 Tomorrow (2008) – Kato Keito
 Hammer Session! (2010) – Tsukamoto Tetsuya

Stage
 Macbeth (Musical Air Gear) (2007/01, Tokyo + Osaka)
 Macbeth (Musical Air Gear vs. Bacchus Super Range Remix) (2007/05, Tokyo)
 RUN&GUN stage: Blue sheets  (2008/01 Tokyo + Osaka) – Nagai
 RUN&GUN stage 2: Yoosoro (2008/10)

External links 
 
 Akira Nagata's blog
 Run&Gun.jp - Official website 

1985 births
Japanese male actors
People from Sakai, Osaka
Living people
Musicians from Osaka Prefecture